The 2016–17 Sydney Uni Flames season is the 37th season for the franchise in the Women's National Basketball League (WNBL).

Roster

Standings

Results

Regular season

Finals

Semifinals

Grand Final

Awards

In-season

Postseason

References

External links
Sydney Uni Flames Official website

2016–17 WNBL season
WNBL seasons by team
2016–17 in Australian basketball
Basketball,Sydney Uni Flames
Basketball,Sydney Uni Flames